|}

The Pomfret Stakes is a Listed flat horse race in Great Britain open to horses aged three years or older.
It is run at Pontefract over a distance of 1 mile and 6 yards (1,615 metres), and is scheduled to take place each year in July.

The race was first run in 2004, as a handicap.  It became a conditions race with Listed status in 2007.

Records
Most successful horse:
 No horse has won this race more than once

Leading jockey (2 wins):
 Royston Ffrench – Sound Breeze (2005, 2006)
 Ted Durcan - Blue Ksar (2007), Emerald Commander (2011)
 Silvestre de Sousa - Big Country (2018), Marie's Diamond (2019)

Leading trainer (3 wins):
 Mark Johnston - Sound Breeze (2005), Marie's Diamond (2019), Dark Vision (2020)
Saeed bin Suroor – Blue Ksar (2007), Rio De La Plata (2010), Emerald Commander (2011)

Winners

See also
 Horse racing in Great Britain
 List of British flat horse races

References
Racing Post:

Flat races in Great Britain
Pontefract Racecourse
Open mile category horse races
Recurring sporting events established in 2004
2004 establishments in England